The Misamis Occidental Provincial Board is the Sangguniang Panlalawigan (provincial legislature) of the Philippine province of Misamis Occidental.

The districts used in appropriation of members is coextensive with the legislative districts of Misamis Oriental.

Aside from the regular members, the board also includes the provincial federation presidents of the Liga ng mga Barangay (ABC, from its old name "Association of Barangay Captains"), the Sangguniang Kabataan (SK, youth councils) and the Philippine Councilors League (PCL).

Apportionment

List of members

Current members 
These are the members after the 2022 local elections and 2018 barangay and SK elections:

 Vice Governor: Rowena "Wheng" L. Gutierrez (PDP-Laban)

Past members

Vice Governors

1st District Board Members

2nd District Board Members

Philippine Councilors League President 
These are members representing a group of elected councilors from the three City Councils (Oroquieta, Ozamiz and Tangub) and fourteen Municipal Councils of Misamis Occidental.

Association of Barangay Councils President 
These are members representing a group of elected Barangay captains from the 490 Barangay councils of Misamis Occidental.

Sangguniang Kabataan Federation President 
These are members representing a group of elected SK chairpersons from the 490 Barangay youth councils of Misamis Occidental.

Indigenous People Mandatory Representative

References 

Provincial boards in the Philippines
Politics of Misamis Occidental